Gnathophis leptosomatus is an eel in the family Congridae (conger/garden eels). It was described by Christine Karrer in 1983. It is a marine, deep water-dwelling eel which is known from Madagascar, in the western Indian Ocean. It dwells at a depth range of 420–428 metres.

References

leptosomatus
Taxa named by Christine Karrer
Fish described in 1983